is a 1951 Japanese drama film written and directed by Kaneto Shindo. It was Shindo's debut film as a director. It is an autobiographical work based on Shindo's first marriage. Jūkichi Uno stars as a struggling screenwriter, and Nobuko Otowa stars as the wife who supports him through his early struggles.

Plot
Yamazaki, an aspiring screenwriter, played by Jūkichi Uno, is boarding with a couple and their daughter. He and the daughter become involved romantically and the father asks him to leave, and tells the daughter not to marry Yamazaki because of his insecure line of work.

In the end the wife dies of tuberculosis.

Cast
 Nobuko Otowa as Takako Ishikawa
 Jūkichi Uno as Keita Numazaki
 Ichirō Sugai as Masuda, director of the film studio
 Ryōsuke Kagawa as Kōzō Ishikawa
 Masao Shimizu as Masuda
 Yuriko Hanabusa as Yumie Ishikawa
 Osamu Takizawa as Film Director Sakaguchi
 Saburō Date as Sakunosuke Ōta

References

External links
 
 

1951 films
1950s Japanese-language films
1951 drama films
Films directed by Kaneto Shindo
1951 directorial debut films
Japanese drama films
Japanese black-and-white films
1950s Japanese films